Melanthera biflora (sin. Wollastonia biflora) also known as sea daisy, beach daisy and sea ox-eye, is a  species of flowering plant in the family Asteraceae. It is a scandent, rough-looking and fast-growing plant with a wide distribution.

Distribution
Melanthera biflora is a moderately salt-tolerant plant found in the tropical belt of the Indo-Pacific region, including China, the Indian Subcontinent, Southeast Asia, Queensland, and islands of the Pacific such as Fiji, Niue, Tonga, Samoa and the Cook Islands.

It is found commonly in islands and in coastal areas, although it sometimes occurs inland in neglected and unmanaged plantations as well as in ruderal environments.

Together with Portulaca oleracea, Ipomoea pes-caprae and Digitaria ciliaris, Melanthera biflora is usually one of the first species colonizing degraded or altered environments in tropical zones of the planet.

Description
Melanthera biflora is a hardy and somewhat woody, sprawling perennial herb or subshrub. Stems are elongate and branched; they can reach up to 2 m but will bend after reaching a certain height.

It can scramble and straggle over the ground or climb leaning on other plants for support. The leaves are ovate, shortly tapering at the base. It produces small yellow flower heads with a diameter of about 8–10 mm. The fruits form a dense head.

Uses
Despite the rough appearance of the plant, the leaves are edible. In Malaysian cuisine the shoots are eaten cooked as a leaf vegetable and in Langkawi they are eaten raw with chilli and sambal shrimp paste. 
Leaves also have traditional medicinal uses as poultice or as decoction.

Melanthera biflora has traditionally been used as a medicinal plant in many cultures, including in Marovo in the Solomon Islands. Leaves are especially valued against stomachache. In Fiji the leaves are used to treat acne.
Root extracts have anthelmintic properties and flowers can be used as a purgative.

This plant is also used as fodder for rabbits.

References

External links

Hanson, A.D. et al. ''Biosynthesis of 3-dimethylsulfoniopropionate in Wollastonia biflora (L.) DC.

biflora
Flora of tropical Asia
Flora of Australia
Flora of the Pacific
Medicinal plants
Ruderal species